Sport Club Municipal Timișoara, commonly known as SCM Timișoara, was a professional women's basketball team from Timișoara, Romania..

The team was founded in the summer of 2016 to continue the women's basketball tradition in Timișoara after the dissolution of the old team, BCM Danzio. The team was dissolved at only two years after its foundation.

Honours
 Liga I
Winners (1): 2016–17

References

External links
 Official Website
 Eurobasket 

Sport in Timișoara
Defunct basketball teams in Romania
Women's basketball teams in Romania
Basketball teams established in 2016
Basketball teams disestablished in 2018
2016 establishments in Romania
2018 disestablishments in Romania